The 2022 North Las Vegas mayoral election was held on November 8, 2022, to elect the next mayor of North Las Vegas, Nevada. Incumbent mayor John Jay Lee retired to run unsuccessfully for Governor of Nevada.

Background
In 2017, John Jay Lee was reelected with 80.77% of the vote. He was initially elected as a Democrat, though after more progressive factions took control of the state party in 2021, he switched his affiliation to the Republican Party, and chose to run for Governor of Nevada. With the open seat in a heavily Democratic city, several Democrats saw an opportunity to win the open seat.

Candidates

Advanced to general
 Pamela Goynes-Brown, city councilor
 Pat Spearman, state senator from the 1st district

Eliminated in primary
 Jesse Addison III, U.S. Navy veteran
 Nathan Atkins, U.S. Army veteran and businessman
 Gary Bouchard
 Laura Perkins, university regent
 Robert Taylor, small business owner

Declined
 John Jay Lee, incumbent mayor (ran for governor)

Primary election

Results

General election

Results

References 

North Las Vegas mayoral
North Las Vegas
Mayoral elections in North Las Vegas, Nevada